Avala Neralu is a 1983 Indian Kannada-language film,  directed by  A. T. Raghu and produced by Magehalli Ranganath. The film stars Ambareesh, Ambika, Vajramuni and Dinesh. The film has musical score by Joy.

Cast

Ambareesh as Raja
Ambika as Lakshmi
Vajramuni as Rudraiah
Dinesh as Ramaiah
Sundar Krishna Urs as Rangappa, Lakshmi's Brother
Lakshman as Made Gowda
Sudheer
Musuri Krishnamurthy
Rathnakar
 M. S. Umesh as Kalaiah
Dingri Nagaraj
Jr. Narasimharaju
Bheema Rao
Master Ramesh
Sathyapriya as Lalitha, Rudrayya's wife
Prashanthi Nayak
Mamatha
Mallika

Soundtrack
The music was composed by Joy Raja.

References

1983 films
1980s Kannada-language films
Films scored by Joy Raja